Kvalsundet is a strait in Hammerfest Municipality in Troms og Finnmark county, Norway. The strait separates the island of Kvaløya from the mainland. The strait is crossed by Kvalsund Bridge, which connects Kvaløya to the mainland and is the world's northernmost suspension bridge. Norway's first power station based on tidal currents is located in the strait.

Still in the 1990's the strait was full of fish. Particularly the sei and cod were heavily fished in the strait and the waters around the Kvalöya with armadas of 80 - 100 trawlers coming into the sound every summer. This way the fish was practically wiped out from the strait in 20 years.

References

Straits of Norway
Landforms of Troms og Finnmark
Hammerfest
Kvalsund